Mark Jury is a fictional character from the British channel 4 soap opera Hollyoaks, played by Ash Newman. Mark debuted on-screen in 2005 and remained on-screen until his following departure later on in the year.

Casting
In 2005, it was announced that former Family Affairs actor and the youngest winner ever of the Best Actor Award at the New York Independent Film Festival, Ash Newman (who also played Manni in the unknown series Goal), had been cast in the role of Mark. The character was given a backstory as the old boyfriend of the fellow character Jessica Harris (Jennifer Biddall).

Storylines
Mark arrives in the village to see his ex-girlfriend Jessica, who did not know he was visiting, in an attempt to rebuild their relationship. He decides to switch courses and transfer from his old university to study at Hollyoaks Community College. Mark is ecstatic when Jessica agrees to resume their relationship. However, he discovers that Gilly Roach (Anthony Quinlan) also likes Jessica. Mark is shocked when Jessica reveals that she has been going out with both of them simultaneously.

Mark begins to feud with Roach for Jessica's affection, however, she grows tired of their arguing and refuses to go out with either of them. Mark cannot cope with the rejection and contemplates quitting university to escape Jessica. When Olivia Johnson (Rochelle Gadd) discovers his plans, she talks him out of it. Following her advice, he transfers to another university and leaves Jessica behind.

References

External links
 Character profile at the Internet Movie Database

Hollyoaks characters
Television characters introduced in 2005
Male characters in television